St. Anthony of Padua Catholic Church is a historic Catholic church in The Village section of Jersey City. It is best known for its former school and its boys' basketball program coached by Bob Hurley, Sr.

History 
Prior to church's construction, Polish parishioners in Jersey City had to take a ferry across to New York City to attend St. Stanislaus Church. The church was built in 1892 to serve what is now the oldest Polish-speaking parish in New Jersey. It was added to the National Register of Historic Places in 2004.

For much of its modern history it has been known for its former school, St. Anthony High School, and its historic basketball program coached by Bob Hurley, Sr.

See also 
 St. Anthony High School (New Jersey)
 White Eagle Hall
 National Register of Historic Places listings in Hudson County, New Jersey

References

External links
Official Website

Roman Catholic churches in New Jersey
Churches on the National Register of Historic Places in New Jersey
Gothic Revival church buildings in New Jersey
Roman Catholic churches completed in 1892
19th-century Roman Catholic church buildings in the United States
Churches in Jersey City, New Jersey
National Register of Historic Places in Hudson County, New Jersey
New Jersey Register of Historic Places
Polish-American culture in New Jersey
Polish-American Roman Catholic parishes in the United States